Banisilan, officially the Municipality of Banisilan (Maguindanaon: Inged nu Banisilan, Jawi: ايڠايد نو بنيسيلن; Iranun: Inged a Banisilan, ايڠايد ا بنيسيلن; ;), is a 2nd class municipality in the province of Cotabato, Philippines. According to the 2020 census, it has a population of 46,995 people.

History
Banisilan accidentally acquired its name from a type of fresh water shell called the Banisil which were then abundant in the area.

Before Banisilan was created as a separate municipality from Carmen, its mother town, President Ramon Magsaysay signed Proclamation No. 317 dated July 17, 1956 reserving an area of 100,018 hectares of land for a resettlement project which was under the general administration (NARRA) now known as the Department of Agrarian Reform. This resettlement project covers three (3) municipalities and part of these is the North Cotabato Resettlement Project No. 1. As years passed, hundreds of landless and qualified citizens coming from almost all parts of the country were resettled in the area. On March 19, 1959, the first batch of settlers from Panay called SAKADA, headed by Jesus T. Alisasis who become the first Vice Mayor, set foot in Banisilan and in the succeeding months, other tribes from Luzon followed.

Possible isolation due to future establishment of Bangsamoro
During the 2001 Referendum for inclusion to the Autonomous Region in Muslim Mindanao, two (2) out of twenty-eight (28) barangays of Carmen, Cotabato chose to be part of ARMM, but were excluded because they are not connected to the main region of ARMM. During 2010-2016 Administration, the Bangsamoro ideal sprouted and a newly proposed region was in the making. According to the agreements signed by the Moro Islamic Liberation Front and the Administration of Noynoy Aquino, Carmen will be included in Bangsamoro because of the two out of twenty-eight barangays that voted in favor of joining the Muslim region back in 2001. Unfortunately, Bangsamoro was not implemented before the term of Aquino ended. Despite this, the current administration aims to establish a Federal Government, where Bangamoro will be realized into a State of the Philippines wherein Carmen will be included in Bangsamoro.

Plans to establish a new municipality in the south of Carmen so that the indigenous and Christian central and northern part of Carmen will be retained in North Cotabato has yet to be confirmed. The idea arose because once the entire municipality of Carmen is included in Bangsamoro, the province of North Cotabato will be cut into half, leaving three towns (Banisilan, Alamada, and Libungan) at its west without connection to the center of North Cotabato, isolating these towns in the process.

Geography
Located at the northern quadrant of Cotabato Province bounded on the north by the municipality of Wao, Lanao del Sur, on the east to north-east by the municipality of Carmen and Bukidnon, on the west by Alamada, on the south by the municipality of Pikit.

Barangays
Banisilan is politically subdivided into 20 barangays.

Climate

Banisilan has wet and dry seasons, a general characteristic of the Philippine climate.

Demographics

Economy

A large agricultural area is devoted to agri-production, producing resources like corn, palay, rubber, sugar cane and fruit trees.

Tourism
 Mount Opao  - This mountain is located between the boundaries of Banisilan and Alamada. It has natural grown trees and a cold spring.

References

External links
 Banisilan Profile at the DTI Cities and Municipalities Competitive Index
 [ Philippine Standard Geographic Code]
 Philippine Census Information

Municipalities of Cotabato